Outhman Khatir (born 27 June 1991) is a Chadian professional footballer who plays as a right-back. He has made two appearances for the Chad national team.

References

External links
 

1991 births
Living people
People from N'Djamena
Chadian footballers
Association football fullbacks
Chad international footballers